Jiang Shiquan (December 1, 1725–April 3, 1784) was a Chinese poet of the Qing dynasty. He was active during the Qianlong and Jiaqing eras of the Qing dynasty, and was classed as one of the "Three Great Masters of the Qianlong Era" along with Yuan Mei and Zhao Yi. Jiang stated that he learned from Li Shangyin when he was 15, turned to study Du Fu and Han Yu when he was 19, and studied Su Shi and Huang Tingjian at the age of 40, and abandoned the style of the ancient authors to write his own poets. He was against the restorative trend of the "Former and Latter Seven Masters", and disagreed with the poetry theories of Weng Fanggang and Shen Deqian. He claimed to absorb both the styles of Tang and Song. But his comprehension of "Xingling" was different from that of Yuan Mei.

Today we know about 2500 of his poems. Jiang also wrote Ci and proses. He was also an important playwright, leaving us 16 plays.

References

1725 births
1784 deaths
People from Shangrao
Qing dynasty poets
Poets from Jiangxi
18th-century Chinese writers